Medium Raw: Night of the Wolf is a 2010 horror thriller television film directed by Andrew Cymek. The run time is 111 minutes.

Plot
Capturing the sadistic serial killer "The Wolf" was just the beginning for rookie cop Johnny Morgan. As he escorts the monster to his new home in the dark underground halls of Parker's Asylum, bedlam ensues and Johnny along with a handful of civilians become players in a night of survival against the world's most terrifying inmates.

Cast

References

External links

2010 television films
2010 films
2010 horror films
2010s thriller films
Canadian independent films
2010s crime films
English-language Canadian films
2010s Canadian films